Akira Ishii (born 6 May 1957 in Ibaraki Prefecture) is a Japanese politician who has served as a member of the House of Councillors of Japan since 2016. He represents the National proportional representation block and is a member of the Japan Innovation Party.

References 

Living people
1954 births
Politicians from Ibaraki Prefecture
21st-century Japanese politicians
Members of the House of Councillors (Japan)
Japan Innovation Party politicians